The following is a list of vehicles bearing the Chrysler brand name. In addition to Chrysler models built in the United States, the list also includes vehicles manufactured in other countries and cars designed by other independent corporations that were rebranded for Chrysler. "Chrysler Australia" was the Australian division of Chrysler, and cars made by Chrysler Australia were sold mainly in their country of origin. The same goes for cars marked "Europe" and "Canada".

Production models

Current lineup

Notes

Former production 

Notes

Concept cars

References

Chrysler